Ian Walker may refer to:
 Ian Walker (firefighter) (born 1945/1946), New Zealand volunteer firefighter.
Ian Walker (footballer) (born 1971), English former footballer and goalkeeping coach
 Ian Walker (playwright) (born 1964), American playwright
 Ian Walker (politician) (born 1954), Member of Parliament in Queensland, Australia
 Ian Walker (sailor) (born 1970), British sailor